Tabaseyn or Tabasin or Tabbasein may refer to:
 Tabaseyn-e Bala
 Tabaseyn-e Pain